Julian Rachlin (born 8 December 1974) is a Lithuanian-born violinist, violist and conductor.

Background and early life
Born in Vilnius, he emigrated in 1978 with his musician parents to Austria. In 1983, he entered the Konservatorium Wien and studied violin in the Soviet tradition with Boris Kuschnir, while also receiving private lessons from Pinchas Zukerman.  His career as a child prodigy began with his first public concert in 1984.

In 1988, he took the title of Eurovision Young Musician of the Year, which led to his being invited to appear at the Berlin Festival with conductor Lorin Maazel and to his becoming the youngest soloist to ever play with the Vienna Philharmonic, under the direction of Riccardo Muti.

Career
In the development of his career, Rachlin has enjoyed collaborations with some of the most illustrious maestros in Europe and the United States, including Jakub Hrůša, Lahav Shani, Vladimir Ashkenazy, Zubin Mehta, Christoph Eschenbach, Mariss Jansons, Juanjo Mena, Manfred Honeck, Myung-whun Chung, Bernard Haitink, James Levine, and André Previn.

In 2000, he joined Rostropovich and Yuri Bashmet, among others, in the premiere of Krzysztof Penderecki's Sextet. The same year, Rachlin also founded his own music festival in Dubrovnik, "Julian Rachlin and Friends". Since 2000, he has also played the concerto and chamber repertoire for the viola.

In 2005, Rachlin made his Carnegie Hall debut when he performed with the New York Philharmonic under Maazel.

In 2014, Rachlin was appointed Principal Guest Conductor of the Royal Northern Sinfonia.

In 2015, Rachlin performed at the closing ceremony of the 10th International Yuri Bashmet Festival in Minsk, Belarus.

In October 2023, he will be appointed the new music director of Jerusalem Symphony Orchestra.

Rachlin plays the "ex Liebig" Stradivarius violin (which is loaned to him by its owner, the Dkfm. Angelika Prokopp Privatstiftung).

Other performances
Besides performing violin concertos, Rachlin also performs chamber music with such artists as Martha Argerich, Itamar Golan, Natalia Gutman, Gidon Kremer, Mischa Maisky, and used to perform with Mstislav Rostropovich.

Rachlin's recordings of the violin concertos of Brahms, Sibelius, and Tchaikovsky, as well as of Shostakovich's Sonata for Viola and Piano, op. 147, have been lauded by music critics.

In April 2009, he performed with the Malaysian Philharmonic Orchestra (MPO).

In 2009 he performed at the Eilat Festival in Israel, and shared stage with Aleksey Igudesman, Pavel Vernikov, Aisha Syed, Boris Kuschnir, and Maxim Vengerov

In 2011, he performed with the Israel Philharmonic Orchestra for its 75th anniversary gala. The same year he declined an invitation to play in the Miyazaki Prefecture due to radiation concerns in Japan from Fukushima I nuclear accidents, though Miyazaki Prefecture as well as much of Western part of Japan were said to be not affected by the recent disasters or radiation; proceeds from the concert went to the 2011 Tōhoku earthquake and tsunami Victim.

In 2013, he played at Mughal-era Shalimar Gardens in Srinagar, Kashmir in a concert conducted by Zubin Mehta called Ehsaas-e-Kashmir, playing the third movement of Tchaikovsky's violin concerto.

From 2018 to 2019 he served as a guest violinist with the Slovenian and Turku Philharmonic as well as Chicago Symphony and Royal Northern Sinfonia orchestras.

During those years, he also was a guest conductor with the English Chamber Orchestra, Royal Philharmonic Orchestra and the Royal Liverpool Philharmonic in England, as well as with the Moscow Virtuosi, Moscow Philharmonic and the State Academic Symphony Orchestra of the Russian Federation. He also known for his orchestra performances in Central and Southern Europe which includes such venues as the Hungarian National Philharmonic, Konzerthausorchester Berlin, Orchestre philharmonique de Strasbourg, Orchestra della Svizzera Italiana, the Prague Philharmonia, Saalbau Essen, the Vienna Symphony Orchestra and Musikverein.

Awards
In 2000, he was awarded the International Prize of the Accademia Musicale Chigiana of Siena.

References

External links

(April 23, 2009), Let's Dance The Star Online. 

1974 births
Living people
Austrian classical violists
Austrian classical violinists
Male classical violinists
Lithuanian emigrants to Austria
Musicians from Vienna
Winners of Eurovision Young Musicians
21st-century classical violinists
21st-century male musicians
21st-century violists